CCJs or CCJS  may stand for:

Cornway College a private, co-educational, day and boarding school in Zimbabwe.
Council of Christians and Jews
County Court judgments